KFPX-TV (channel 39) is a television station licensed to Newton, Iowa, United States, broadcasting the Ion Television network to the Des Moines area. Owned and operated by the Ion Media subsidiary of the E. W. Scripps Company, the station maintains offices on 114th Street in Urbandale, and its transmitter is located in Alleman, Iowa.

Newscasts
For a short time in 2001, KFPX ran a prime time newscast produced by NBC affiliate WHO-TV (channel 13) to compete with Fox affiliate KDSM-TV (channel 17)'s Fox News at Nine (which WHO eventually took over from CBS affiliate KGAN in Cedar Rapids). After that newscast was canceled, KFPX reran WHO-TV's 10:00 p.m. newscasts on a 30-minute delay until early 2005.

Technical information

Subchannels
The station's digital signal is multiplexed:

Analog-to-digital conversion
KFPX-TV shut down its analog signal, over UHF channel 39, on June 12, 2009, the official date in which full-power television stations in United States transitioned from analog to digital broadcasts under federal mandate. The station "flash-cut" its digital signal into operation UHF channel 39.

Former transmitter site
KFPX previously maintained transmitter facilities in Baxter, Iowa. Due to its short tower height, the station's broadcasting radius was largely confined to the immediate Des Moines area, although some southern and western suburbs may have had difficulty picking up the station's signal. Therefore, KFPX relied on cable and satellite carriage to reach the entire market. With the move to Alleman, KFPX now provides over-the-air coverage comparable to the market's other stations.

References

External links
Ion Television website

Ion Television affiliates
Court TV affiliates
Laff (TV network) affiliates
Ion Mystery affiliates
Defy TV affiliates
TrueReal affiliates
E. W. Scripps Company television stations
Television channels and stations established in 1998
1998 establishments in Iowa
Television stations in Des Moines, Iowa
Newton, Iowa